Pablo Gómez Ortiz de Guzmán (born 21 May 1970) is a Spanish retired footballer who played as a midfielder, and a current manager.

A penalty kick and set piece specialist, he amassed La Liga totals of 252 games and 16 goals over nine seasons, with Rayo Vallecano, Valladolid and Alavés, appearing in 295 competitive matches in his two spells with the latter club and reaching the 2001 UEFA Cup Final. He added 229/30 in Segunda División, in representation of four teams.

Playing career
Born in Vitoria-Gasteiz, Álava, Gómez started his professional career in 1990 with UE Lleida, which he represented during two Segunda División seasons. In summer 1992 he signed for Rayo Vallecano, making his La Liga debut on 5 September by playing 67 minutes in a 0–1 away loss against Valencia CF. His first goal in the latter competition arrived on 16 May 1993, in a 2–2 home draw to CD Tenerife.

After appearing in 35 games (four goals) during the 1993–94 campaign, Gómez also featured in the promotion play-offs against SD Compostela, lost 1–3 on aggregate. He nonetheless stayed in the top flight, joining Real Valladolid.

Gómez spent eight of the following nine years with Deportivo Alavés, scoring a career-best ten goals in 1995–96 and 1997–98, competing in both cases in the second tier and winning his only piece of silverware in the latter season. He continued to be an important midfield element for the Basques subsequently, contributing to a best-ever sixth-place finish in 1999–2000 with one goal from 34 appearances. The following campaign, he played eight matches in the team's runner-up run in the UEFA Cup, coming on as a 64th-minute substitute for two-time scorer Javi Moreno in the final against Liverpool, lost 5–4 in extra time.

After being relegated in 2003, the 33-year-old Gómez resumed his career in division two, retiring after one season apiece with Alavés and Ciudad de Murcia.

Coaching career
In 2007, Gómez returned to Alavés after the election of president Fernando Ortiz de Zárate, being named coach of the youth sides. The following year, he was promoted to the reserves in Tercera División.

On 12 February 2009, after Javi López was appointed at the helm of the first team, Gómez was named his assistant. The pair were not able, however, to prevent second-division relegation.

Gómez returned to Alavés' youths in June 2012.

Honours
Alavés
Segunda División: 1997–98
UEFA Cup runner-up: 2000–01

References

External links

1970 births
Living people
Footballers from Vitoria-Gasteiz
Spanish footballers
Association football midfielders
La Liga players
Segunda División players
Segunda División B players
UE Lleida players
Rayo Vallecano players
Real Valladolid players
Deportivo Alavés players
Levante UD footballers
Ciudad de Murcia footballers
Spain youth international footballers
Spain under-21 international footballers
Basque Country international footballers
Spanish football managers
Tercera División managers
CD Aurrerá de Vitoria footballers